Cochrane High School may refer to:

Cochrane High School (Cochrane, Alberta), Cochrane, Alberta
Cochrane High School (Regina, Saskatchewan), Regina, Saskatchewan